The following lists events that happened during 1871 in Chile.

Incumbents
President of Chile: José Joaquín Pérez (until September 18), Federico Errázuriz Zañartu

Events

June
15 June - Chilean presidential election, 1871

October
6 October - Corpbanca begins business.

Births
25 January - Juan Pablo Bennett (d. 1951)
4 August - Enrique Molina Garmendia (d. 1964)

Deaths
29 August - Marcos Maturana (b. 1802)

References 

 
1870s in Chile
Chile
Chile
Years of the 19th century in Chile